Alexandru Păcurar (born 20 January 1982) is a Romanian professional football player.

Career

Steaua București
On 25 July 2010 he makes dream debut for Steaua in Liga I against Universitatea Cluj. On 29 August he scored his first goal for Steaua in the 1–1 home match against FC Timişoara. On the next day, the club chairman George Becali announced, that he was sold due to bad discipline. Păcurar spent only 2 months in Steaua and was sold to Universitatea Cluj.

PFC CSKA Sofia
On 27 July 2012 Alex signed a 3-year contract with PFC CSKA Sofia. Păcurar made his official debut for CSKA in 3–0 home win against Botev Vratsa.

References

External links
 
 
 

1982 births
Living people
Sportspeople from Cluj-Napoca
Romanian footballers
Association football midfielders
ACF Gloria Bistrița players
FC Universitatea Cluj players
FC Dinamo București players
CS Pandurii Târgu Jiu players
FC Steaua București players
PFC CSKA Sofia players
Romanian expatriate footballers
Expatriate footballers in Bulgaria
Romanian expatriate sportspeople in Bulgaria
Liga I players
First Professional Football League (Bulgaria) players
FC Rapid București players